Frank Douglas Bathgate (February 14, 1930 – February 21, 2015) was a Canadian ice hockey centre. He played in two NHL games for the New York Rangers.

His brother is the Hockey Hall of Famer Andy Bathgate. He died in 2015.

References

External links

1930 births
2015 deaths
Canadian ice hockey centres
Ice hockey people from Winnipeg
New York Rangers players